Moses Holden (21 November 1777 – 3 June 1864) was an English astronomer, known particularly for giving lectures on astronomy.

Life
Holden was born in Bolton, Lancashire, the second youngest of five children of Thomas Holden, a handloom weaver, and his wife Joyce. As a youth he worked in a foundry at Preston, until disabled by an accident. On his recovery he worked as a landscape gardener. From early in life he possessed a love of astronomy; he collected a library, and gave talks on the subject.

In 1814–15 he constructed a large orrery and a magic lantern, made to illustrate his astronomical lectures. These were first given in the Theatre Royal, Preston, in 1815, and then in many towns in the north of England; their success led to his touring throughout (northern) England to give lectures. He lectured at the Theatre Royal, Nottingham, in 1817. In 1826 he devoted the proceeds of one of his lectures to the erection of a monument in St. Michael's Church, Toxteth Park, Liverpool, to the memory of the astronomer Jeremiah Horrocks.

In 1818 Holden published A small Celestial Atlas, or Maps of the Visible Heavens, in the Latitude of Britain, (3rd edition 1834, 4th edition 1840). It was one of the earliest works of the kind published at a low price. He also compiled an almanac, published in 1835 and later. He made several microscopes, and made a telescope for the Revd William Carus Wilson.

He settled in Preston in 1828, where he gave courses on astronomy until 1852. He assisted in establishing the Preston Institution for the Diffusion of Knowledge, and from 1837 he was an enthusiastic member of the British Association for the Advancement of Science. In 1834 the Freedom of the Borough was conferred on him. Holden died at his home in Jordan Strret, Preston on 3 June 1864, aged 86.

References

 Moses Holden, 1777 - 1864:  Preston's Pioneering Astronomer  Stephen R. Halliwell (2021)   Produced for the University of Central Lancashire by Canopus Publishing Ltd.

Attribution
 

1777 births
1864 deaths
People from Bolton
19th-century British astronomers